Kamlesh Oza is an Indian television actor. He is notable for playing the role of Hemal Thakkar  in Hats Off Productions' Baa Bahoo Aur Baby which is aired on STAR Plus, Bhavesh Kumar in Instant Khichdi.

Bansuriwala in crime patrol satrak

Hindi movies: Ghulam....Ghaath...dil to badha hai jee.  Dil mange more.....Break k baad ...Loins of Punjab

Hamari bahu malinis iyer with sridevi on sahara channel. 

Oza is also a veteran of the Gujrati Stage and has acted in number of gujarati plays since 1986. He has adapted, directed, acted in and produced 2 idiots play and thappo and working with umesh shukla on his play ek room rasodu

Partial filmography
 Ghulam - Avinash - Hari's Brother (film)
 X Zone - Episode-99
 Baa Bahoo Aur Baby - Hemal (television)
 Khichdi (TV series) - Bhavesh Kumar (television)
 Hasratein - Chetan 
 Break Ke Baad - Rishabh (film)
 Mrs. Tendulkar - Gangaram Godbole Bank Owner's son
 Malini Iyer - Bobby Sabarwal (television)
 Crime Patrol (TV series)
Savdhaan India

References

Indian male television actors
Living people
Year of birth missing (living people)
Indian male soap opera actors
Place of birth missing (living people)
Indian male musical theatre actors